Jia Zhanbo (born 15 March 1974) is a Chinese sports shooter. He competed at the 2004 and 2008 Olympics in two 50 m small-bore rifle events, prone and three positions, and won the three positions event in 2004.

External links

1974 births
Living people
Chinese male sport shooters
ISSF rifle shooters
Olympic gold medalists for China
Olympic shooters of China
People from Xinyang
Shooters at the 2004 Summer Olympics
Shooters at the 2008 Summer Olympics
Olympic medalists in shooting
Sport shooters from Henan
Medalists at the 2004 Summer Olympics
21st-century Chinese people